Glutaminyl-peptide cyclotransferase is an enzyme that in humans is encoded by the QPCT gene.

This gene encodes human pituitary glutaminyl cyclase, which is responsible for the presence of pyroglutamyl residues in many neuroendocrine peptides. The amino acid sequence of this enzyme is 86% identical to that of bovine glutaminyl cyclase.

References

Further reading